Total Control Racing (TCR) was a toy brand from Ideal which debuted in the late 1970s, similar to slot car sets, with approximately HO scale cars (and smaller scale semi-trailer trucks) that operated on a slotless track.

Description

The plastic track contained lanes of three metal strips about 2 mm (0.08 inch) wide, which made contact with a configuration of two brass pads on the underside of the cars, providing power. The brass pads could be arranged in one of two possible configurations by the user. Whichever configuration a car was set to would determine which two of the three power providing metal strips were being drawn from and, hence, which of the two controllers was for which car. The plastic track had two such lanes, and cars could change lanes with the flick of a switch on the controller. TCR sets came with "jam cars", a slow moving drone which both racers had to avoid crashing into. Like Matchbox's Powertrack, some cars featured lights.

The first sets consisted of up to 4 Formula 5000 cars. The track (which stayed the same throughout successive generations of cars) was wide enough for two cars side by side and had raised edges along both sides to prevent the cars from leaving the track. No more than one or two cars could be controlled and raced. They were controlled by the user by means of a trigger controller which also carried a toggle switch. When switched up, the car would travel in the outermost lane of the track, when switched down, the car would travel in the innermost lane of the track. By this means, the user could genuinely overtake their opponent by switching lanes at the correct moment. The two remaining cars were 'Jam Cars' which would run around the track when either or both of the trigger controllers were depressed. The Jam Cars were slower than the racing cars and had front wheels that were fixed to steer permanently left or right. This meant that a Jam Car was relatively easy to pass, or manoeuvred automatically out of the way as you approached (as a lapped vehicle would in a race).

The first generation of cars worked on the principle that, when the lane changing switch was flicked, the motor of the car would reverse direction, sending the power to only one of the rear wheels. The resultant bias of having one driven wheel forced the car to run (up against the raised edge) in one or other of the lanes. Later, more complex generations of TCR cars steered by means of the reversal of the motor triggering the steering mechanism of the front wheels to be fixed left or right. These later cars have driven power to both rear wheels and had much greater performance than the earlier generations. If scaled up to actual size, a TCR car would run along a straight at perhaps 350 mph and corner at not much less.

The original sets consisted of only two different types of track part. A 15" straight and a 90 degree bend. Later sets added 45 degree bends and 10" straights. More elaborate sets included a 4 lanes wide straight that allowed you to drive off onto a second track or a pitlane, a banked corner where the centrifugal force generated by a fast moving car would allow it to run off from the electronic power strips onto a banked extension to the outside of the corner and, from a Dukes Of Hazzard TCR set, a ramp and jump.

Subsequent editions of TCR vehicles included articulated lorries, ambulances, dune buggies, trucks, go-karts and numerous replicas of road cars and many famous cars from film, television and motor racing. As can be seen below, many car companies and famous brands allowed TCR licence. Each of these different editions of vehicle sat atop an identical chassis and drive train.

In use, as a toy, TCR was compromised by three factors.

 The speed of the cars, when they were working well, was so high that the possibility of overtaking another car was very low. The cars were all thrown to the outermost lane in every corner. Because of this, the outermost lane in an oval track would always be the fastest lane to run in. This meant that the cars being raced were using the same lane of the track, often nose-to-tail. The act of changing lanes along a straight to pass your opponent would cause a relative drop in performance as the cars left one set of electric strips in the track and steered across to the other. This effect meant that all but the slowest of opponents could not be passed, even along a significant straight. (The later addition of 45 degree bends made it possible to create overtaking spots by placing all the cars in the innermost lane at the start of a straight. Since the cars would then naturally steers themselves immediately into the outermost lane, an overtaking manoeuvre could be effected by flicking the lane changer switch to make the car stay in the innermost lane down the straight before then being thrown by centrifugal force to the outside of the next corner in front of your opponent. The manoeuvre would then be finished by switching the lane change controller to return to driving in the favoured then from then on).
 Due to the raised edge along the outside of every piece of track, a car would almost never leave the track from going too fast. Whilst this did prevent TCR from having the stop/start, run-to-fetch-a-spun-vehicle nature of Scalextric (particularly in young hands), it did mean that a TCR race required no particular skill and the user of the faster car would always win. (Speed equalisers and power boosters were later made available to attempt to level the playing field).
 The cars themselves (particularly the later generations) were relatively delicate and only worked properly within a narrow margin of track cleanliness and overall car wear. The brass pads or shoes on the underside of the cars were easily knocked off and quick to wear away. An entire chassis of a TCR car would sag after many hours of use, causing it to drag along the track and lose performance. Dust and lint would gather inside the chassis around the moving parts, causing a great drop in performance. Tyres, shoes and motors all had a short life and required frequent servicing and replacing. This might not be unexpected in a toy that is running at a high speed, with constant friction and subjection to the battering of track sides for several hours. Numerous spares were available, but expensive. Whilst the cars themselves rarely lasted (certainly not in the hands of a child), the track pieces remain indestructible to this day.

Withdrawal
The product was withdrawn from the market in the mid 1980s (after a brief attempt to reinvent TCR as a slot racing system, which was incompatible with all earlier cars and track).

TCR may have failed next to its most obvious competitor Scalextric for these and other reasons. TCR cars were matchbox sized and much smaller than Scalextric cars. This did mean that (relatively) more track could be laid out in one room.

TCR was also doomed by the new regulations for child safety. The system required at least 2 amps to correctly drive all the cars and jam cars used. The original set released in the early 1970s gave the customer a 1/2 amp transformer which was reported to give children electric shocks when they went to fix a stalled or 'de-railed' car. As a response Ideal changed the transformer in the mid 1970s to a 1/4 amp transformer; this was barely enough to run one car, when players used 2 cars plus the jam cars it was very hard to maintain the rhythm needed to keep the cars rolling properly with such low amperes. Sales for the product dropped off dramatically because of the change. Tyco had the same problem with the first Command control sets (1978). In the 1990s Tyco revamped the system. They bought the rights to 'TCR' from Ideal and were able to lower the voltage to increase the amperes and skirt the child safety laws. This gave the customer a 1/2 amp back, for 3 years Tyco tried to make a go of the command control revamp called 'TCR' but it never caught on, stalls and derails were always a problem. It is not until you run these systems on custom power supplies that give the racing set the full 2-2.5 amps of power it needs that it really shines. 

In the UK the amps problem seems to be slightly different, for example, the Zig-Zag Jam Raceway set had a 3/4 amp power pack. There are higher amp sets that contain mark 3 cars such as the later Crossfire, these sets have an 'uprated' power pack which is 20 Volt 20 VA which equals 1 amp. 

TCR sets are now relatively collectable items on internet auction sites. Many spares in original packaging, as well as entire sets, individual cars and smaller selections of track are sold to collectors.

Sets
ENGLISH/EU SETS:

Classic sets -
 Ultimate Road Racing System (Early * Indy Jam Circuit)
 Indy Jam Circuit (Circuit No 1 Champion in France)
 Super 4 Twin Circuit (4 Car System) (Includes 2 Crossover Tracks)
 Lighted Jam Car Speedway
 Crossfire (Includes 2 Crossover Tracks)
 Trailer Cutoff Jam Car Race Set
 Super Jam car Speedway
 Zig Zag Jam Raceway (Featuring 3 cars) (Circuit TCR Zig Zag in France)
 Truck Racing (With Lap Counter & Card Diorama)
 Lighted Juggernaut Raceway (2 truck system; Red Cab & Gold Tanker Trailer & White Cab & Silver Container Trailer)

Later sets:
 Electronic super booster speedway (Contains Super Booster Power Balancing Unit)
 Police Pursuit Lighted Tilt Jump Race Set (Circuit TCR - "Tremplin" in France)
 High Banked Speedway (?)
 Dukes Of Hazzard Tilt Jump
 Stop & Go (Stop & Go Barrier Accessory) (Black Trans Am V's Black Door Police Nova)(The "Smokey & The Bandit" Set)

Lighted blazers -
 Lighted Blazers
 Lighted Blazers Glo-Charger Special (Glo Cars & UV Light Charger)
 Lighted Blazers Jam Car Special (Glo Cars)
 Lighted Blazers Zig Zag Jam Speedway (Glo Cars)

"Lane Changers" Sets:
 Lane Changers Broken Bridge Chase
 Lane Changers Collision Course [1990's]
 Lane Changers Roller Coaster (Includes 2 Roller Coaster/Sand Dune Track pieces)
 Lane Changers 3 level raceway)

GERMAN SETS:
 Peugeot 205 Turbo 16 Set
 Jumped Trailer Set
 Convoi
 Freispur-Autorennbahn 500

FRENCH SETS:
 Circuit TCR Zig Zag
 Formula 5000
 Rallye 1 (French)
 Changement De File Alain Prost 
 Changement De File Championnat F1 Jacques Villeneuve 
 Changement De File Peugeot 905 (High Banked)(905 Vs 905)
 Changement De File Peugeot 905 (High Banked)(905 Vs Red Porsche)(French)
 Changement De File Rallye Raid (Jump Track with Cardboard Diorama)(Citroen ZX Vs Peugeot 405 T 16)
 Champion Challenge (Lane Changing)

French "Action" Sets:
 Face A Face
 Precipice (Duel Level Jump Set)(White Lamborghini Countache Vs red #44 Porsche)
 Duel (Red Oil Tanker Truck Versus Black Lamborghini Countach - Includes a Tunnel Jump)
 Police Poursuite (Black Door Police Nova Vs Red & White Camaro #88)
 Circuit TCR - "Tremplin"

ITALIAN SETS:
 Polistil Sorpasser

BRAZILIAN SETS:
 Monza Grand Prix Set
 Brasil Rallye Set
 Monte Carlo Rallye Set
 San Remo Rallye Set
 Porto Alegre - São Paulo Highway Set
 São Paulo - Rio de Janeiro Highway Set
 Rio de Janeiro - Salvador Highway Set
 Kart Set

US SETS:
 Jam Van National
 Off Road Jam Challenger
 Pro Am Jam Racing Set
 Racing Rigs Jam Roadway (Raceway? Speedway?)

Cars non-themed

Cars TV/film themed

Accessories

 Lap Counter
 Speed Equalizer: allowed the customer to balance speed performance between cars by setting a slider. Was a good way to evenly match cars of different generations, and detune a car that was too fast compared to the other car.
 High bank turn: attachment that would fit on the curved sections of the track and allow the cars to use centrifugal force to slide up a banked wall and look just like a NASCAR high banked turn. Allowed the cars to pass over and under each other.
 Electronic Super Booster: This accessory allows the cars on the track to have equal performance. Another function is to allow cars an extra power increase which would then allow overtaking for a few seconds once per lap. This accessory replaced the original terminal and was not released in the UK.
This accessory combined the Speed Equalizer with a single channel voltage doubler. A 555 Timing chip circuit drove a voltage doubler that would give each car a speed boost, but only in one lane change direction. from the inside lane to the outside lane. This actually made racing more unfair, because each car started in either the inside or outside lane parallel to each other. On the first trigger pull off the line, the outside lane car would automatically receive a speed boost, while the inside car would not. Only when the inner lane car changed lanes to the outside lane would it receive its voltage boost.
Any car changing lanes from the outside lane to the inside lane would not receive boost. I think Ideal originally designed the super booster to provide boost for any lane change left or right, but cut the design in half to save on manufacturing and dropped the 2 extra circuits needed to produce a full boost effect. Since it was thought that the inner lane was always at a disadvantage to the outside line having the boost only help the car increase speed from the inside to outside lane change was supposed to make things fair. In reality it did not and required the player to bias the speed Equalizer bar more to limit a cheater using the outside wall centrifugal force to maintain top speed and not fly off the track.

Track specifications

Trackside advertising
 Shell
 Dunlop
 Texaco
 GTX
 Martini

External links
Patent for Total Control Racing, with description of method of working.
  Brazilian lycensed built TCR models by TROL Industrias Plasticas S.A.
Slot car brands
Ideal Toy Company